Callus is a surname. Notable people with the surname include:

Ashley Callus (born 1979), Australian sprint freestyle swimmer
Daniel Callus (1888–1965), Maltese historian and philosopher 
Helen Callus, British violist
Sharon Callus (born 1956), Maltese lawn bowler

Maltese-language surnames